Miles Arthur Halhead Hammond (born 11 January 1996) is an English cricketer who plays for Gloucestershire County Cricket Club.

Born in Cheltenham and educated at St Edward's School, Oxford,and before that Christ Church Cathedral School in Oxford. Hammond played a number of matches for the England Under-19 cricket team. He spent the 2014 season playing for Home Counties League side Aston Rowant, near his home in Oxfordshire.

He scored 103, his first century, for Gloucestershire against Sussex, in July 2018. In April 2022, he was bought by the Birmingham Phoenix for the 2022 season of The Hundred.

References

External links
 

Living people
1996 births
English cricketers
Gloucestershire cricketers
People educated at St Edward's School, Oxford
Oxfordshire cricketers
Marylebone Cricket Club cricketers
Birmingham Phoenix cricketers